William Lansing Downing (born August 1, 1949) is a former judge of the Superior Court of Washington for King County (Seattle) and a former deputy prosecutor. He is notable for his ruling that same-sex marriages are legal in Washington, as well as for the prosecutions of the Wah Mee massacre killers.

In 1978, he graduated with a J.D. from the University of Washington School of Law, along with classmate Robert S. Lasnik.

Footnotes

External links
Text of same-sex marriage decision
http://www.seattlepi.com/local/185153_judge06.html?searchpagefrom=3&searchdiff=16
http://seattletimes.nwsource.com/html/localnews/2001997223_downing05m.html

1949 births
Living people
Washington (state) state court judges
Vassar College alumni
Superior court judges in the United States
University of Washington School of Law alumni
Lawyers from Seattle